

547001–547100 

|-bgcolor=#f2f2f2
| colspan=4 align=center | 
|}

547101–547200 

|-bgcolor=#f2f2f2
| colspan=4 align=center | 
|}

547201–547300 

|-bgcolor=#f2f2f2
| colspan=4 align=center | 
|}

547301–547400 

|-bgcolor=#f2f2f2
| colspan=4 align=center | 
|}

547401–547500 

|-bgcolor=#f2f2f2
| colspan=4 align=center | 
|}

547501–547600 

|-id=599
| 547599 Virághalmy ||  ||  (1932–2019) was a Hungarian physicist and astronomer. He was the long-time technical chief at the Konkoly Observatory and introduced CCD astronomy at the Piszkéstető Station. || 
|}

547601–547700 

|-id=666
| 547666 Morgon ||  || Villié-Morgon, is a small French village in the Rhône department, known for its appellations of the Beaujolais vineyard. || 
|}

547701–547800 

|-bgcolor=#f2f2f2
| colspan=4 align=center | 
|}

547801–547900 

|-bgcolor=#f2f2f2
| colspan=4 align=center | 
|}

547901–548000 

|-bgcolor=#f2f2f2
| colspan=4 align=center | 
|}

References 

547001-548000